Tetracha spinosa is a species of tiger beetle that was described by Brullé in 1837.

References

Cicindelidae
Beetles described in 1837
Taxa named by Gaspard Auguste Brullé